Pseudophoxinus caralis is a species of ray-finned fish in the family Cyprinidae. It is found in Lake Beyşehir basin in Central Anatolia, Turkey.

Its natural habitat is freshwater lakes.

References

Pseudophoxinus
Endemic fauna of Turkey
Fish described in 1942